Crisularia plumosa is a species of bryozoan belonging to the family Bugulidae, commonly known as the feather bryozoan. It is native to the Atlantic Ocean.

Description
The founding zooid is circular and spineless. As it buds and develops into a colony, a robust central trunk is formed, and branches grow out dichotomously from this in a characteristic spiral fashion, each with fine feathery branchlets. The colony is whitish, or pale tan.

Distribution and habitat
Crisularia plumosa is native to the northeastern Atlantic Ocean, its range extending from the North Sea and the coasts of the British Isles and Ireland, to the Iberian peninsula and Madeira; it is found sparingly in the Mediterranean Sea. It grows on rocky coasts with limited water movement, and on piers and jetties, and tolerates high levels of sediment in the water.

Ecology
Crisularia plumosa is a filter feeder; the tentacles on the lophophore create a current that wafts diatoms, bacteria and other small organic particles within reach, and these are conveyed to the mouth. This species is a protandrous hermaphrodite and colonies have both male and female zooids; each individual zooid starts its existence as a male and later becomes a female. Sperm, liberated into the water column by male zooids, is drawn into female zooids where fertilisation takes place; the embryos are retained in a brood chamber. The larvae have a short planktonic phase before settling on the substrate and undergoing metamorphosis. Other animals, such as small sea spiders, sometimes take shelter among the branchlets of the clumps. Alongside Flustra foliacea, this species forms part of a dense bryozoan "turf" that is found on heavily silted but moderately wave-exposed rocks and  boulders round certain coasts of Britain just below the littoral zone; the habitat is dominated by sponges Suberites ficus, Suberites carnosus and Hymeniacidon perleve.

References

Cheilostomatida
Fauna of the Atlantic Ocean
Fauna of the Mediterranean Sea
Animals described in 1766
Taxa named by Peter Simon Pallas